Andrew Harrison Ward (January 3, 1815 – April 16, 1904) was a U.S. Representative from Kentucky.

Early life and family
Andrew H. Ward was born near Cynthiana in Harrison County, Kentucky. He was the son of Andrew and Elizabeth (Headington) Ward. Ward was named for his father and for William Henry Harrison, under whom his father served in the War of 1812.

Ward attended the county schools, then matriculated to Transylvania University in Lexington, Kentucky. He served as clerk on a steamboat on the Tombigbee River for several years. He began to study law in 1842 and was admitted to the bar in 1844, commencing practice in Cynthiana.

In 1846, Ward married Ellen V. Moore. The couple had one daughter (Mollie M. Ward Gaddy) before Ellen V. Moore Ward died in 1848. Ward married Elizabeth Ware on December 31, 1857; she died in 1865, leaving no children. On April 28, 1868, he married Helen H. Lair. The couple had two daughters – Bertie M. (Ward) Lafferty and Catherine Ward – and three sons – Harry R. Ward, Paul S. Ward, and Ashley F. Ward.

Political career
During his early political career, Ward was affiliated with the Whig Party, but after the dissolution of the Whigs, he associated himself with the Democratic Party. He was elected city attorney of Cynthiana in 1860.  In 1861, Ward unsuccessfully sought election to the Kentucky House of Representatives but was elected to that chamber two years later, serving a single, two-year term. He was an unsuccessful candidate for election to the Thirty-ninth Congress in 1864 but was later elected to represent the Sixth District to the 39th Congress to fill the vacancy caused by the resignation of Green Clay Smith. He served from December 3, 1866, to March 3, 1867, and was not a candidate for renomination in 1866.

Although he never formally enlisted for service in the American Civil War, he opposed secession and was among the 330 citizens who successfully resisted John Hunt Morgan's raid on Cynthiana in 1864.

Later life and death
Following his tenure in Congress, Ward resumed the practice of law. He defended the first case of treason tried in Kentucky. He practiced law into his eighties, and the maximum penalty ever imposed on one of his clients was ten years in the penitentiary. Concurrent with his late law practice, he served as president of the National Bank of Cynthiana and was Sunday school superintendent at the local Christian church. He died in Cynthiana, Kentucky, on April 16, 1904, and was interred in Battle Grove Cemetery.

References

Bibliography

1815 births
1904 deaths
American Disciples of Christ
American members of the Churches of Christ
Kentucky lawyers
Kentucky Whigs
Members of the Kentucky House of Representatives
People from Harrison County, Kentucky
People of Kentucky in the American Civil War
Transylvania University alumni
Democratic Party members of the United States House of Representatives from Kentucky
19th-century American politicians